Kabi Nazrul Mahavidyalaya, established in 1988, is a general degree college in Sonamura, Tripura. It offers undergraduate courses in arts, commerce and sciences. It is affiliated to  Tripura University.

Departments

Science
Chemistry
Physics
Mathematics
Environmental Science
Information Technology

Arts
Bengali
English
History
Political Science
Philosophy
Education
Sociology
Physical Education
Economics

Accreditation
The college is recognized by the University Grants Commission (UGC).

See also
Education in India
Education in Tripura
Tripura University
Literacy in India
List of institutions of higher education in Tripura

References

Colleges affiliated to Tripura University
Educational institutions established in 1988
Universities and colleges in Tripura
1988 establishments in Tripura
Colleges in Tripura